Antwerp High School is a public high school in Antwerp, Ohio.  It is the only high school in the Antwerp Local School District.  Their nickname is the Archers.  They are a member of the Green Meadows Conference. Their biggest rivalry is with Wayne Trace High School.

Clubs and activities

Ohio High School Athletic Association State Championships

 Girls Volleyball – 1992 
 Girls Softball - 2019

External links
 District Website

References

High schools in Paulding County, Ohio
Public high schools in Ohio
Public middle schools in Ohio
Public elementary schools in Ohio